The Eastern Hockey League began operation in 1978 as the Northeastern Hockey League, filling the void in the former territory of the Eastern Hockey League.

Bill Beagan was named commissioner of the Northeastern Hockey League on June 14, 1979, to replace Jack Timmins who resigned. The league was rebranded as the Eastern Hockey League, which Beagan oversaw for two seasons until 1981. The league was not successful and after an owners' meeting on July 19, 1981, it was decided to fold the league.

Two of the teams – Baltimore Clippers and the Salem Raiders – joined the Atlantic Coast Hockey League in 1981. One team – the Erie Blades – joined the American Hockey League that same season. The remaining teams folded with the league and ceased operations.

Teams

References

 
1978 establishments in the United States
1981 disestablishments in the United States
Sports leagues established in 1978